Serhiy Mykolayovych Sernetskyi (born 30 August 1981) is a football striker from Ukraine. His current club is FK Ventspils.

Due to problems with health, he early retired in 2007.

Playing career

Facts
In March 2007 FC Baltika Kaliningrad also interested about Serhij Sernecki, but he joined FK Ventspils

Honours
Ventspils
 Virslīga: 2007
 Latvian Cup: 2007,

References

External links

1981 births
Living people
Sportspeople from Ternopil
Ukrainian footballers
Ukrainian expatriate footballers
Expatriate footballers in Latvia
FC Haray Zhovkva players
FK Ventspils players
FC Stal Alchevsk players
FC Arsenal Kyiv players
FC Nyva Ternopil players
FC CSKA Kyiv players
FC Sokil Berezhany players
Ukrainian Premier League players
Ukrainian First League players
Ukrainian Second League players
Ukrainian Amateur Football Championship players
Association football forwards